Lynette Lim Shu En (Lim Shu-En, born 25 April 1992) is an Olympic freestyle swimmer from Singapore. She swam for Singapore at the 2012 and 2008 Summer Olympics, the 2009 and 2007 World Championships, and the 2007 South East Asian Games.

As of 2009, she holds the Singaporean Records in the women's 400m, 800m, and 1500m freestyles, and 4 × 100 m, 4 × 200 m freestyle relays.

Early years
Lim attended Palm Springs High School in Palm Springs, California. She was in the class of 2010. She swam for the Piranha Swim Team in Palm Springs and the high school swim team for Palm Springs. Lim attended the University of Southern California, graduating in 2014 with a degree in kinesiology, and was on the USC swimming and diving team as a distance freestyler. During her career at USC she was a three-time all-American on relay.

References

External links
 
 
 
 

1992 births
Living people
Olympic swimmers of Singapore
Asian Games competitors for Singapore
Competitors at the 2007 Southeast Asian Games
Palm Springs High School people
People from Loma Linda, California
Southeast Asian Games bronze medalists for Singapore
Southeast Asian Games gold medalists for Singapore
Southeast Asian Games medalists in swimming
Southeast Asian Games silver medalists for Singapore
Sportspeople from Palm Springs, California
Swimmers at the 2008 Summer Olympics
Swimmers at the 2010 Asian Games
Swimmers at the 2012 Summer Olympics
Swimmers at the 2014 Asian Games
University of Southern California alumni
Singaporean female freestyle swimmers
21st-century Singaporean women